Çayqaraqaşlı (also, Çay Qaraqaşlı and Chaykarakashly) is a village and municipality in the Shabran District of Azerbaijan.  It has a population of 451.

References 

Populated places in Shabran District